Lumparland is a municipality of Åland, an autonomous territory of Finland. It is the smallest municipality on mainland Åland.

The municipality is unilingually Swedish.

The main village is Klemetsby, where there is a bank, a church, a post office and a school. The ferry port of Långnäs is situated in the eastern part of Lumparland.

Lumparland was the last municipality in Finland to establish its own website which happened in 2004.

The municipality has previously also been known as "'Lumparlanti" in some Finnish documents, but is today referred to as "Lumparland" also in Finnish.

Geography 

Lumparland borders the eastern edge of a billion-year-old nine-kilometer wide water filled impact crater, Lumparn, which is devoid of islands.

Lumpokasen is the highest point in the municipality.

Economy 

Agriculture and tourism are the most important lines of business in Lumparland.

Sights 

The Church of Lumparland, dedicated to St. Andrew, is the oldest surviving wooden church in Åland, dating back to the 1720s. Inside the church, the altar painting is the work of Victor Westerholm. There is also a miniature ship from 1836 inside the church.

Notable people 
 Robert Helenius (born 1984), a professional boxer

References

External links

Municipality of Lumparland – Official website
 Map of Lumparland municipality

Municipalities of Åland
Port cities and towns in Finland
Port cities and towns of the Baltic Sea